Jean Dreux is a retired slalom canoeist who competed for France in the 1950s. He won a gold medal in the C-2 team event at the 1951 ICF Canoe Slalom World Championships in Steyr.

References

French male canoeists
Possibly living people
Year of birth missing
Medalists at the ICF Canoe Slalom World Championships